San Miguel de Salcedo (better known as Salcedo) is a city in Cotopaxi Province, Ecuador. It is the capital of Salcedo Canton.

Populated places in Cotopaxi Province